The women's mass start in the 2011–12 ISU Speed Skating World Cup was contested over three races on three occasions, out of a total of seven World Cup occasions for the season, with the first occasion involving the event taking place in Astana, Kazakhstan, on 25–27 November 2011, and the final occasion taking place in Berlin, Germany, on 9–11 March 2012.

Mariska Huisman of the Netherlands won the cup, while Claudia Pechstein of Germany came second, and Anna Rokita of Austria came third.

The mass start was a new event for the season.

Top three

Race medallists

Standings 
''Standings as of 11 March 2012 (end of the season).

References 

Women mass start
ISU